Bao Bao (meaning "treasure"; colloquially meaning "baby") is a female giant panda cub who was born at the National Zoo in Washington D.C. She lived at the Zoo for four years until February 2017. She is currently located at the China Conservation and Research Center for the Giant Panda in Sichuan Province. She is the sister of Tai Shan, Bei Bei and Xiao Qi Ji.

Life 
Bao Bao was born on August 23, 2013, at 5:30 PM, together with a twin that was stillborn the day after she was born, at the National Zoo in Washington D.C. The cub of Mei Xiang and Tian Tian, Bao Bao is a result of artificial insemination of Mei Xiang on March 23, 2013.

Giant pandas are listed as a vulnerable species, and are protected in part by conservation efforts at reservations and in zoos such as the Smithsonian National Zoo in Washington D.C. Bao Bao is one of only several hundred giant pandas alive today in captivity, among fewer than 2,000 giant pandas in the world, the first surviving panda cub born at the National Zoo since Tai Shan in 2005.

In 2013, there were an unusually high number of giant panda cub births in zoos around the world. In addition to Bao Bao, other giant panda cubs were born in 2013 include: Yuan Zai in Taiwan, twin cubs Mei Lun and Mei Huan at Zoo Atlanta, Fu Bao at Zoo Vienna and Xing Bao at Zoo Madrid.

Naming ceremony and debut 
Bao Bao was named 100 days after her birth. Her name was chosen by voters through the Smithsonian's website. Five names were originally submitted by various dignitaries and groups, including Chinese Ambassador Cui Tiankai, U.S. Ambassador to China Gary Locke, panda keepers at the National Zoo, the fundraising group Friends of the National Zoo and the China Conservation and Research Center for the Giant Panda. The chosen name was submitted by Friends of the National Zoo. The five choices for names were Bao Bao (宝宝), Ling Hua (玲花), Long Yun (龙韵), Mulan (木兰), and Zhen Bao (珍宝).

Michelle Obama, First Lady of the United States, and Peng Liyuan, First Lady of China, each sent special video messages that were played during the naming ceremony. Bao Bao's birth, naming ceremony, and travel to China in 2017 are part of China's panda diplomacy.

Bao Bao's public debut at the National Zoo was on January 18, 2014.

Development 
By August 19, 2014, Bao Bao could stand on her hind legs when keepers asked, and could recognize her name when it is called by familiar voices. She did not yet consistently respond as an adult giant panda would, even to her mother Mei's unique bleat. More often, she moved inside when called instead of remaining in her favorite trees, napping or resting. She had learned to follow Mei outside most days, and was rarely carried out any more. Bao Bao was being trained in targeting behaviors; she was touching her nose to a target at about five months. By August, she could follow one partway inside from the outdoor yard. She also started raiding Mei's bamboo supply and sampling it, another major milestone. Fruitsicles were her preferred reward over cooked sweet potato, corn syrup, and diluted apple juice.

Bao Bao celebrated her first birthday on August 23, 2014, with a giant birthday cake made of frozen fruits and vegetables. Crowds of visitors gathered at the zoo to celebrate her birthday.

On the afternoon of December 23, 2014, Bao Bao climbed a tree after touching a "hot wire". Responding to inquiries from concerned members of the public, the zoo stated that this was a natural reaction to the "hot wire", and that Bao Bao was safe and comfortable in the tree. After over 24 hours in the tree, Bao Bao safely climbed down on her own, late on December 24.

A YouTube video was released by the National Zoo on Tuesday, January 6, 2015, of Bao Bao's first encounter with snow.

On Thursday, February 19, 2015, in an online news release by her keepers at the National Zoo's David M. Rubenstein Family Giant Panda Habitat and Panda House, found on the National Zoo's website in the "Meet Our Animals" section, on the Giant Panda page news updates, it was stated that Bao Bao is about 18 months- a year and a half- old, another major milestone. The statement said, around this time, "... they stop nursing and start living separately from their mothers. Bao Bao started the weaning process naturally a few months ago, and now she’s eating significantly more bamboo and solid foods. She also eats separately from Mei Xiang and spends about 6 hours separated from her each day. They will spend increasingly more time apart until Bao Bao is living on her own. Bao Bao has been doing well during the time she spends apart from Mei. Our panda team expects that the process will be complete in early March. Last month our panda team and veterinarians performed an ultrasound along with human cardiologist Dr. Rosenthal on Mei Xiang (*Bao Bao's mother) as part of a routine checkup. She is in great health. Mei usually participates in ultrasounds when the panda team is monitoring her for possible pregnancies..." The rest of the release is viewable through this link.

The separation was completed in early March 2015, as planned, and went well.

Bao Bao celebrated her second birthday on August 23, 2015, one day after her mother Mei Xiang gave birth to twin pandas on August 22, 2015. Mei Xiang gave birth to twin males on August 22, 2015 at 5:35 pm and 10:07 pm. However, only one of the cubs, Bei Bei, survived.

Bao Bao remained at the National Zoo until February 21, 2017, when she was sent to China; She is currently located at the Wolong National Nature Reserve.

Motherhood
Bao Bao gave birth to a female giant panda cub named Dou Ban (nicknamed Bao Bao Zai by nannies before official naming) on July 29, 2020 at the Wolong National Nature Reserve Shenshuping Panda Center (Sichuan Province, China).

A year later, Bao Bao gave birth to twin males on August 4, 2021. One of the male twins is with Bao Bao, and the other male twin is with a surrogate Mother.

There is information about Bao Bao and Her Cubs, and the other Members of Her Family on the Smithsonian's National Zoo & Conservation Biology Institute website. https://nationalzoo.si.edu/animals/celebrating-50-years-giant-pandas

See also
 List of giant pandas

References

External links
Giant Pandas at the National Zoo
Panda Cam at National Zoo

Individual giant pandas
2013 animal births